Beneath Apple Manor is a roguelike game written by Don Worth for the Apple II and published by The Software Factory in 1978. Higher resolution "Special Editions" were released in 1982 and 1983, through Quality Software, for the Apple II and Atari 8-bit family. It was one of the first video games to use procedural generation.

Gameplay
The goal is to obtain a Golden Apple on the bottom floor of the dungeon. There are 10 rooms per level in the low-res version, and 5 in the high-res version. The high-res versions may be played in low-res/text mode, thereby gaining this increase in level size. It is notable for being the first commercial role playing game developed and released for a home computer as opposed to a mainframe computer.

Despite being included in the "roguelike" genre, Beneath Apple Manor actually predates Rogue (created in 1980) by two years. The creator claims that neither he nor the creators of Rogue were aware of the other game.

Reception
Alan Isabelle reviewed Beneath Apple Manor in The Space Gamer No. 35, commenting that "All in all, strengths by far outnumber weaknesses. The game is highly recommended."

Softline in 1983 said of Beneath Apple Manor—Special Edition that "now it's back, and it's better", including improved graphics, varying difficulty levels, and the ability to save progress. The magazine concluded that "BAM is not a game that you will tire of easily ... [it] is for any adventurer, beginner to expert". Computer Gaming Worlds Scorpia stated in 1991 and 1993 that Beneath Apple Manor was "terribly slow even by the standards of the day, but it was fun nonetheless" and "not bad for a game" designed for a 16K Apple II.

References

External links 
 

1978 video games
Apple II games
Atari 8-bit family games
Roguelike video games
Role-playing video games
Video games developed in the United States